Merav Zafary-Odiz is Israel's Permanent Representative to the International Atomic Energy Agency (IAEA) and the Preparatory Commission for the Comprehensive Nuclear-Test-Ban Treaty Organization (CTBTO PrepCom) in Vienna. 

Zafary-Odiz earned a Master of Public Policy (MPP) from the Goldman School of Public Policy at the University of California, Berkeley and a BA in International Relations & Political Science from the Hebrew University of Jerusalem.

Publications
Zafary-Odiz M. (2018) The Israeli National Perspective on Nuclear Non-proliferation. In: Maiani L., Abousahl S., Plastino W. (eds) International Cooperation for Enhancing Nuclear Safety, Security, Safeguards and Non-proliferation–60 Years of IAEA and EURATOM. Springer Proceedings in Physics, vol 206. Springer, Berlin, Heidelberg

References

Israeli women ambassadors
Goldman School of Public Policy alumni
Hebrew University of Jerusalem Faculty of Social Sciences alumni
International Atomic Energy Agency officials
Year of birth missing (living people)
Living people